Hirte is a surname of:

 Christian Hirte (born 23 May 1976), German lawyer and politician (CDU) 
 Greg Hirte, American professional violinist, actor, and composer
 Heribert Hirte (born 31 March 1958), German legal scholar and politician (CDU) 
 Klaus Hirte (28 December 1937 – 15 August 2002), German operatic baritone